Community Educational Television, Inc. (CET) is a subsidiary of the Trinity Broadcasting Network (TBN) which owns six TBN-affiliated television stations in Texas and Florida, all on channels allocated for non-commercial educational broadcasting as mandated by the Federal Communications Commission (FCC). CET's general offices, along with its flagship station KETH-TV, are located in the Alief section of Houston.

All CET stations broadcast generally the same schedule as other TBN stations, with some local programs and educational programming (other than the FCC-mandated E/I shows) to satisfy the educational license.

Stations
 KETH-TV, Houston, Texas (flagship)
 KITU-TV, Beaumont, Texas
 KLUJ-TV, Harlingen, Texas
 KHCE-TV, San Antonio, Texas
 WJEB-TV, Jacksonville, Florida
 WTCE-TV, Fort Pierce, Florida

External links
Community Educational Television

Trinity Broadcasting Network
Religious television stations in the United States
Television broadcasting companies of the United States
Companies based in Houston